Cresaptown-Bel Air was a census-designated place in Allegany County, Maryland, United States. The population was 5,884 at the 2000 census. For the 2010 census, the area was separated into two CDPs, Cresaptown and Bel Air.

Cresaptown-Bel Air is part of the Cumberland, MD-WV Metropolitan Statistical Area.

Geography
Cresaptown-Bel Air is located at  (39.587355, −78.842582).

Demographics
As of the census of 2000, there were 5,884 people, 1,765 households, and 1,251 families residing in the CDP. The racial makeup of the CDP was 78.21% White, 20.73% African American, 0.05% Native American, 0.51% Asian, 0.14% from other races, and 0.36% from two or more races. Hispanic or Latino of any race were 0.44% of the population.

There were 1,765 households, out of which 31.7% had children under the age of 18 living with them, 58.8% were married couples living together, 9.1% had a female householder with no husband present, and 29.1% were non-families. 24.9% of all households were made up of individuals, and 12.0% had someone living alone who was 65 years of age or older. The average household size was 2.41 and the average family size was 2.88.

In the CDP, the population was spread out, with 17.1% under the age of 18, 7.4% from 18 to 24, 39.9% from 25 to 44, 22.9% from 45 to 64, and 12.7% who were 65 years of age or older. The median age was 38 years. For every 100 females, there were 164.3 males. For every 100 females age 18 and over, there were 176.5 males.

The median income for a household in the CDP was $40,693, and the median income for a family was $46,563. Males had a median income of $39,397 versus $22,170 for females. The per capita income for the CDP was $20,279. About 4.0% of families and 6.5% of the population were below the poverty line, including 7.8% of those under age 18 and 5.5% of those age 65 or over.

References

Unincorporated communities in Maryland
Unincorporated communities in Allegany County, Maryland
Former census-designated places in Maryland
Cumberland, MD-WV MSA